Paul Rudzinski (born July 28, 1956) is a former American football player. He professionally as a linebacker in the National Football League (NFL) for three seasons with the Green Bay Packers.

References

1956 births
Living people
American football linebackers
Green Bay Packers players
Michigan State Spartans football players
Players of American football from Detroit